Adolph Marx may refer to:

 Harpo Marx (Adolph Marx, 1893–1964), American comedian and film star
 Adolph Marx (bishop) (1915–1965), first Roman Catholic bishop of Brownsville, Texas

See also
 Adolf Bernhard Marx (1795–1866), German composer, musical theorist and critic
 Adolf Marks, German publisher in Russia